Fragaria moupinensis is a species of wild strawberry native to China. It is similar in appearance to F. nilgerrensis.

All strawberries have a base monoploid count of 7 chromosomes. Fragaria moupinensis is tetraploid, having 4 pairs of these chromosomes for a total of 28 chromosomes.

References

External links
G.M. Darrow, The Strawberry: History, Breeding and Physiology.  Online version, chapter 8.

moupinensis